Wu Hsiao-li (born 11 October 1983) is retired Taiwanese volleyball player who plays as the main setter in the Chinese Taipei women's national volleyball team.

Wu began to play volleyball at the age of 10. She started as an attacker, and soon her position changed to the setter due to her lack of height.

Clubs 
  Da-Cheng Elementary School, Taoyuan County (now in Taoyuan City)
  Da Liao Junior High School, Kaohsiung County (now in Kaohsiung City)
  Chung Shan (2004-2005)
  National Taiwan Normal University

Awards

Individuals
 2004 Asian Club Championship "Best Setter"
 2005 Asian Club Championship "Best Setter"

National team
 World University Games
 Winner: 2005
 Runner-up: 2003

Clubs
 2004 Asian Club Championship -  Bronze Medal with Chung Shan
 2005 Asian Club Championship -  Runner-Up, with Chung Shan

References

1983 births
Living people
Taiwanese women's volleyball players
Sportspeople from Taoyuan City
Volleyball players at the 2002 Asian Games
Asian Games medalists in volleyball
Volleyball players at the 2006 Asian Games
Medalists at the 2006 Asian Games
Asian Games bronze medalists for Chinese Taipei